Provence is a region of southeastern France on the Mediterranean Sea.

Provence may also refer to :

 Kingdom of Provence, a historical kingdom (879-882) in West Francia which became Lower Burgundy
 Provence, Switzerland, a municipality in the canton of Vaud in Switzerland
 SS La Provence, an ocean liner launched in 1905
 French ship Provence, various ships of the French Navy
 La Provence, the main daily newspaper in Provence
 Auberge la Provence, Dutch former Michelin starred restaurant in Laren
 Andrew Provence (born 1961), American football player
 La Provence (restaurant), Dutch Michelin starred restaurant in Driebergen-Rijsenburg

See also
 Province (disambiguation)